The Brent System pipeline transports oil from the North Sea oilfields via Cormorant Alpha to the Sullom Voe Terminal in Shetland, Scotland.  Since 3 August 2009, it is operated by Abu Dhabi National Energy Company replacing the previous operator Royal Dutch Shell.  The Brent system is jointly owned by 21 companies.

Oil transportation system 
Oil is transported from 20 oilfields, including:
 Thistle
 Murchison
 Hutton
 North West Hutton
 Dunlin
 Brent A, B,C & D
 Cormorant Alpha
 North Cormorant
 Tern
 Eider

Pipelines 
The Brent C to Cormorant A pipeline is 30 inches (760 mm) in diameter and 35 kilometres (22 mi) long.

Other oil pipelines are:

The specification for crude oil transported in the Brent system is as follows:

Production
Oil production from the Brent field from 1976 to 1983 was as follows (1000 barrels):

Decommissioning 
Shell UK Limited propose to decommission the Brent Field pipelines in the mid-2020s.

References

North Sea energy
Oil pipelines in the United Kingdom
Oil and gas industry in Scotland
Shell plc buildings and structures
Pipelines under the North Sea